Marie Solange Pagonendji-Ndakala is a Central African Republic politician who is Minister of Development, Tourism and Crafts.

References

Living people
Year of birth missing (living people)
Place of birth missing (living people)
Government ministers of the Central African Republic
21st-century women politicians
Women government ministers of the Central African Republic